Sulu Sou Ka-hou is a Macau resident who was a member of the Macau Legislative Assembly. In 2018 he was the youngest person in that position.

He was elected in 2017, and at that time he became the youngest member of the assembly. 9,212 people voted for him. He is a part of the New Macau Association. He stated that his goal was to have direct elections for all seats of the assembly.

In 2018 he held a protest near Macau Chief Executive Fernando Chui's house, deemed illegal by the government. On 4 December, of his colleagues 28 out of 33 voted to suspend Sou from the assembly so he could be prosecuted under Macau law. In May 2018 he was declared guilty and ordered to pay a fine of 40,800 patacas (US$5,000). He expressed his intention to run for office again after the fine.

In 2021 he filed a request for the Macau government to provide information in English.

The Macau Daily Times ranked Sou as "Person of the Year" in 2017.

By September 2021 the courts ruled he was not sufficiently loyal to the government and so was unable to keep his seat in the assembly.

References

External links

 
 
 

Living people
Members of the Legislative Assembly of Macau
Year of birth missing (living people)